Xin Chunyin (born 13 October 1956) is a Chinese legal scholar and politician who serves as a committee member on in the National Congress of the Chinese Communist Party. She is also the Vice-Chairperson of Legislative Affairs Commission of China's National People's Congress.

Career
Xin was born in 1956 in Tongliao, Inner Mongolia Autonomous Region. After graduating with a degree in Law from Jilin University in 1978 she continued her studies, obtaining a Master's in Law in 1981 from the Chinese Academy of Social Science. Three years later she traveled to the United States as a visiting scholar of UC Berkeley School of Law where she discovered how Chinese politics was being perceived. Finishing her studies overseas in 1986 she returned to China and worked as a scholar at a number of national-level law institutions.

Political career
In March 2003 Xin was elected as a member of the National People's Congress Law Committee, a special committee whose job is to process national legislation and legislative plans of the nation. In that same year she also became a member of the 10th NPC Standing Committee and the Vice-Chairman of the 10th Legislative Affairs Committee.

Since 2008, Xin has withdrawn from many of her committee roles and is now Deputy Secretary-General of NPC Standing Committee.

References

Living people
1956 births
Chinese Academy of Social Sciences alumni
Chinese legal scholars
Chinese women in politics
Jilin University alumni
Members of the 19th Central Committee of the Chinese Communist Party
Members of the Standing Committee of the 10th National People's Congress
Members of the Standing Committee of the 11th National People's Congress
Members of the Standing Committee of the 12th National People's Congress
Members of the Standing Committee of the 13th National People's Congress
People from Tongliao
Women legal scholars